Heinrich Rudolf Simroth (10 May 1851 Riestedt (now a part of Sangerhausen) – 31 August 1917 Gautzsch near Leipzig), was a German zoologist and malacologist. He was a professor of zoology in Leipzig.

Academic career: 1888–1917 University of Leipzig.

He was a specialist for slugs. He discovered and described various new species of slugs.

Species of animals named in honor of him include:
 Bulimulus simrothi (Reibisch, 1892) – snail
 Pseudaneitea simrothi (Suter, 1896) – slug
 Arion simrothi - slug
 Tapinoma simrothi Krausse, 1911 - ant
 Bipalium simrothi - planarian

It was thought that there is no collection by Simroth. His collection of type specimen of 43 slugs has been found Museum für Naturkunde in Berlin in 2010.

Bibliography 
 Simroth H. (1886). "Weitere Mittheilungen über palaearktische Nacktschnecken". Jahrbücher der Deutschen Malakozoologischen Gesellschaft 13: 16-34.
 Simroth H. (1891). "Die Nacktschnecken der portugiesisch-azorischen Fauna in ihrem Verhältnis zu denen der paläarktischen Region überhaupt". Nova Acta Academiae Caesareae Leopoldino-Carolinae Germanicae Naturae Curiosorum 56: [1], 201-424, Tab. IX-XVIII [= 9-18]. Halle.
 Simroth H. (1892). "Ueber die nackten Limaciden und Testacelliden des Kaukasus". Sitzungsberichte der naturforschenden Gesellschaft Leipzig: 40-49.
 Simroth H. (1892–1894). Chapters Polyplacophora, Amphineura and Scaphopoda. In: Bronn H. G. (1892–1894). Dr. H. G. Bronns Klassen und Ordnungen des Tierreichs. Band 3, Mollusca. Abteilung 1, Amphineura und Scaphopoda.
 Simroth H. (1894). "Ueber einige von Herrn Dr. Sturany auf der Balkanhalbinsel erbeutete Nacktschnecken". Annalen des kaiserlich-königlichen Naturhistorischen Hofmuseums 9 (3): 391-394, Taf. 19. Wien.
 Simroth H. (1896). "Über bekannte und neue Urocycliden". Abhandlungen der Senckenbergischen Naturforschenden Gesellschaft 19: 281–312.
 Simroth H. (1898). "Über die Gattung Limax in Russland". Ezhegodnik Zoologicheskogo Muzeya Imperatorskoi Akademii Nauk (Annuaire du Musée Zoologique de l'Académie Impériale des Sciences de St.-Pétersbourg) 3: 52-57.
 Simroth H. (1901). Die Nacktschnecken des Russischen Reiches. St.-Petersburg. 321 pp.
 Simroth H. (1910). "Kaukasische und asiatische Limaciden und Raublungenschnecken". Ezhegodnik Zoologicheskogo Muzeya Imperatorskoi Akademii Nauk (Annuaire du Musée Zoologique de l'Académie Impériale des Sciences de St.-Pétersbourg) 15: 499-560.
 Simroth H. (1910). Lissopode Nacktschnecken von Madagaskar, den Comoren und Mauritius. Unter Berücksichtigung verwandter Arten. In: Reise in Ostafrika in den Jahren 1903–1905. Wissenschaftliche Ergebnisse, 2 (A. Voeltzkow, ed.), 576–622. Schweizerbart, Stuttgart.
 Simroth H. (1912). Neue Beiträge zur Kenntnis der kaukasischen Nacktschneckenfauna. St. Petersburg (Russia), Izvestiya Kavkazskago Muzeya 6: 1-140.
 Simroth H. (1914). "Beitrag zur Kentniss der Nacktschnecken Columbiens zugleich eine Uebersicht über die neotropische Nacktschnecken-Fauna überhaupt". Mémoires de la Société des Sciences naturelles de Neuchatel 5: 270–341. Tables XI-XIV.

References

External links 
 
 works by Heinrich Simroth

19th-century German zoologists
German malacologists
1851 births
1917 deaths
20th-century German zoologists